Messey-sur-Grosne (literally Messey on Grosne) is a commune in the Saône-et-Loire department in the region of Bourgogne-Franche-Comté in eastern France.

Geography
The Goutteuse flows southeast through the middle of the commune, crosses the village, then flows into the Grosne, which forms the commune's southeastern border.

See also
Communes of the Saône-et-Loire department

References

Communes of Saône-et-Loire